The Grey Album is a 2004 album by Danger Mouse, a mix of the Beatles' White Album and Jay Z's Black Album.

The Grey Album may also refer to:
Beatallica (EP), Beatallica's second EP, released in 2004
Echo & the Bunnymen (album), Echo & the Bunnymen's fifth album, released in 1987
Grey (album), Sandy Lam's fourth album, released in 1987
The Velvet Underground (album), the Velvet Underground's third album, released in 1969
The Grey Album (book), a 2012 book of literary and cultural criticism by Kevin Young